Plateau-Central is one of Burkina Faso's 13 administrative regions. It was created on 2 July 2001 and had a population of 977,510 in 2019. The region's capital is Ziniaré. Three provinces make up the region—Ganzourgou, Kourwéogo, and Oubritenga.

As of 2019, the population of the region was 977,510 with 53.1% females. The population in the region was 4.77% of the total population of the country. The child mortality rate was 83, infant mortality rate was 59 and the mortality of children under five was 138. As of 2007, the literacy rate in the region was 21.1%, compared to a national average of 28.3%. The coverage of cereal need compared to the total production of the region was 111%.

Geography

Most of Burkino Faso is a wide plateau formed by riverine systems and is called falaise de Banfora. There are three major rivers, the Red Volta, Black Volta and White Volta, which cuts through different valleys. The climate is generally hot, with unreliable rains across different seasons. Gold and quartz are common minerals found across the country, while manganese deposits are also common. The dry season is usually from October to May and rains are common during the wet season from June to September. The soil texture is porous and hence the yield is also poor. Among West African countries, Burkino Faso has the largest elephant population and the country is replete with game reserves. The northern regions are generally arid and usually have scrub land and semi-deserts. The principal river is the Red Volta, that originates in the northern region and drains into Ghana. The areas near the rivers usually have flies like tsetse and similium, which are carriers of sleep sickness and river blindness. The average rainfall in the region is around  compared to southern regions that receive only  rainfall.

Demographics

As of 2019, the population of the region was 977,510 with 53.1% females. The population in the region was 4.77% of the total population of the country. The child mortality rate was 83, infant mortality rate was 59 and the mortality of children under five was 138.
As of 2007, among the working population, there were 69.5% employees, 10.30% under employed, 19.2% inactive people, 20.2% not working and 1% unemployed people in the region.

Economy
As of 2007, the literacy rate in the region was 21.1 per cent, compared to a national average of 28.3 per cent. The gross primary enrolment was 80.5 per cent, pos-primary was 25 per cent and gross secondary school enrolment was 5.6. There were 0 boys and 0 girls enrolled in the primary and post-secondary level. There were 0 teachers in primary & post-secondary level, while there were 461 teachers in post-primary and post-secondary level. The first set of car traffic was 15, first set of two-wheeler traffic was 1,136 and the total classified road network was 645.
The total corn produced during 2015 was 26,551 tonnes, cotton was 6,424 tonnes, cowpea was 65,486 tonnes, ground nut was 26,668 tonnes, millet was 59,427 tonnes, rice was 15,863 tonnes and sorghum was 120,260 tonnes. The coverage of cereal need compared to the total production of the region was 111.00 per cent.

Administration

Burkina Faso gained independence from France in 1960. It was originally called Upper Volta. There have been military coups till 1983 when Captain Thomas Sankara took control and implemented radical left wing policies. He was ousted by Blaise Compaore, who continued for 27 years till 2014, when a popular uprising ended his rule. As per Law No.40/98/AN in 1998, Burkina Faso adhered to decentralization to provide administrative and financial autonomy to local communities. There are 13 administrative regions, each governed by a Governor. The regions are subdivided into 45 provinces, which are further subdivided into 351 communes. The communes may be urban or rural and are interchangeable. There are other administrative entities like department and village. An urban commune has typically 10,000 people under it. If any commune is not able to get 75 per cent of its planned budget in revenues for 3 years, the autonomy is taken off. The communes are administered by elected Mayors. The communes are stipulated to develop economic, social and cultural values of its citizens. A commune has financial autonomy and can interact with other communes, government agencies or international entities.

References

External links

 
Regions of Burkina Faso